The Siamese crocodile (Crocodylus siamensis) is a medium-sized freshwater crocodile native to Indonesia (Borneo and possibly Java), Brunei, East Malaysia, Laos, Cambodia, Myanmar, Thailand and Vietnam. The species is critically endangered and already extirpated from many regions. Its other common names include Siamese freshwater crocodile, Singapore small-grain, and soft-belly.

Phylogeny

Below is a cladogram based on a 2018 tip dating study by Lee & Yates simultaneously using morphological, molecular (DNA sequencing), and stratigraphic (fossil age) data, as revised by the 2021 Hekkala et al. paleogenomics study using DNA extracted from the extinct Voay.

Characteristics

The Siamese crocodile is a medium-sized, freshwater crocodilian, with a relatively broad, smooth snout and an elevated, bony crest behind each eye. Overall, it is olive-green, with some variation to dark-green.

Distribution and habitat
Siamese crocodiles occur in a wide range of freshwater habitats, including slow-moving rivers and streams, lakes, seasonal oxbow lakes, marshes and swamps.

Behaviour and ecology

Despite conservation concerns, many aspects of C. siamensis life history in the wild remain unknown, particularly regarding its reproductive biology.

Adults feed mainly on fish and snakes, but also eat amphibians and small mammals.

Very little is known about the natural history of this species in the wild, but females build mound-nests constructed from scraped-up plant debris mixed with mud. In captivity, these crocodiles breed during the wet season (April to May), laying between 15 and 50 eggs, which are then guarded until they hatch. After incubation, the female will assist her young as they break out of their eggs and then carry the hatchlings to the water in her jaws.

Pure, unhybridised examples of this species are generally unaggressive towards humans, and there are only four confirmed attacks, none of them fatal. One was defending its young, another was probably defending itself, one was provoked, and the reason for the last is unclear. A fifth attack in 1928 that was probably done by a Siamese crocodile was fatal, with the victim being a child.

Threats
Siamese crocodiles are under threat from human disturbance and habitat occupation, which is forcing remaining populations to the edges of their former range. Extinct from 99% of its original range, the Siamese crocodile is considered one of the least studied and most critically endangered crocodilians in the world. Although few wild populations remain, more than 700,000 C. Siamese are held on commercial crocodile farms in Southeast Asia.

In 1992, it was believed to be extremely close to or fully extinct in the wild until 2000 when scientists from Fauna and Flora International and the Government of Cambodia's Forestry Administration confirmed the presence of Siamese crocodiles in the Cardamom Mountains in Southwest Cambodia. Since then, surveys have identified around 30 sites in Cambodia that contain wild Siamese crocodiles (conservatively estimated to number between 200 and 400 individuals in total), a tiny population in Thailand (possibly as few as two individuals, discounting recent reintroductions), a small population in Vietnam (possibly fewer than 100 individuals), Cat Tien National Park has about 200, and a more sizeable population in Laos. In March 2005, conservationists found a nest containing juvenile Siamese crocodiles in the southern Lao province of Savannakhet. There are no recent records from Malaysia, Burma or Brunei. A small but important population of the crocodiles is also known to live in East Kalimantan, Indonesia.

Habitat degradation
Factors causing loss of habitat include: conversion of wetlands for agriculture, chemical fertilisers use, use of pesticides in rice production, and an increase in the population of cattle. The effects of warfare stemming from the conflicts in Vietnam, Laos, and Cambodia during the Vietnam War (from land mines to aerial bombardment) have also been factored.

Many river systems, including those in protected areas, have hydroelectric power dams approved or proposed, which are likely to cause the loss of about half of the remaining breeding colonies within the next ten years. One cause for habitat degradation via hydrological changes, for the Siamese crocodile, is the implementation of dams on the upper Mekong River and its major tributaries. Potential impacts of dam construction include wetland loss and altered flooding cycle with a dry season flow 50% greater than under natural conditions.

Exploitation and fragmentation

Illegal capture of wild crocodiles for supply to farms is an ongoing threat, as well as incidental capture/drowning in fishing nets and traps. The Siamese crocodile currently has extremely low and fragmented remaining populations with little proven reproduction in the wild.

Siamese crocodiles have historically been captured for skins and to stock commercial crocodile farms. In 1945, skin hunting for commercial farms was banned by the French colonial administration of Cambodia. In the late 1940s, populations spurred the development of farms and harvesting wild crocodiles for stocking these farms. Protection was abolished by the Khmer Rouge (1975–79) but later reinstated under Article 18 of the Fishery Law of 1987, which "forbids the catching, selling, and transportation of...[wild] crocodiles..."

Crocodile farming now has a huge economic impact in the provinces surrounding Tonle Sap, where 396 farms held over 20,000 crocodiles in 1998. Also, many crocodiles were exported from Cambodia since the mid-1980s to stock commercial farms in Thailand, Vietnam, and China.

Despite legal protection, a profitable market exists for the capture and sale of crocodiles to farms since the early 1980s. This chronic overharvesting has led to the decline of the wild Siamese crocodile.

Conservation
This crocodile is classified as critically endangered on the IUCN Red List, and is listed on Appendix I of CITES.

It is one of the most endangered crocodiles in the wild, although it is extensively bred in captivity.

The current situation of C. siamensis represents a significant improvement from the status reported in the 1992 Action Plan (effectively extinct in the wild), but poses major new challenges for quantitative survey and effective conservation action if the species is to survive. While the species remains critically endangered, there is a sufficient residual wild population, albeit severely fragmented across several areas and countries, to provide a basis for recovery.

The Siamese crocodile is relatively unthreatening to people (compared to C. porosus), and the possibility of people and crocodiles coexisting in natural settings seems possible. The powerful economic force of the commercial industry based on C. siamensis also needs to be mobilised and channelled for conservation advantage. Considerable effort and action is still required, but the species has a reasonable chance of survival if the necessary actions can be implemented.

Yayasan Ulin (The Ironwood Foundation) is running a small project to conserve an important wetland habitat in the area of East Kalimantan which is known to contain the crocodiles. Most of them, though, live in Cambodia, where isolated, small groups are present in several remote areas of the Cardamom Mountains, in the southwest of the country, and also in the Virachey National Park, in the northeast of the country.

In Cambodia Fauna and Flora International and the Government of Cambodia's Forestry Administration have established the Cambodian Crocodile Conservation Programme for the protection and recovery of Siamese crocodiles. This programme works with a network of indigenous villages who are helping to protect key sites such as Veal Veng Marsh (Veal Veng District), the Tatai River (Thmar Bang District) and the Araeng River. The latter is considered to have the second largest population of Siamese crocodiles in the world, but is currently threatened by the proposed construction of a massive dam in the river.  During the heavy monsoon period of June–November, Siamese crocodiles take advantage of the increase in water levels to move out of the river and onto large lakes and other local bodies of water, returning to their original habitat once water levels start receding back to their usual levels.

The Cambodian Crocodile Conservation Programme conducted DNA analysis of 69 crocodiles in Phnom Tamao Wildlife Rescue Centre in Cambodia 2009, and found 35 of them were purebred C. siamensis. Conservationists from the Forestry Administration and Fauna and Flora International subsequently launched a conservation breeding program at the Centre. Since 2012, approximately 50 purebred Cambodian Siamese crocodiles have been released into community-protected areas to reinforce the depleted wild populations.

Poaching is a severe threat to this species, with the value of wild Siamese crocodiles reaching hundreds of dollars in the black market, where they are illegally taken into crocodile farms and hybridized with other, larger species. The total wild population is unknown, since most groups are in isolated areas where access is extremely complicated. A number of captively held individuals are the result of hybridization with the saltwater crocodile, but several thousand "pure" individuals do exist in captivity, and are regularly bred at crocodile farms, especially in Thailand.

Pang Sida National Park in Thailand, near Cambodia, has a project to reintroduce Siamese crocodile into the wild. A number of young crocodiles have been released into a small and remote river in the park, not accessible to visitors.

The Wildlife Conservation Society (WCS) is working with the government of Laos on a new programme to save this critically endangered crocodile and its wetland habitat. In August, 2011, a press release announced the successful hatching of a clutch of 20 Siamese crocodiles. These eggs were then incubated at the Laos Zoo. This project represents a new effort by WCS to conserve the biodiversity and habitat of Laos’ Savannakhet Province,  promotes conservation of biodiversity for the whole landscape, and relies on community involvement from local residents.

In September 2021, eight hatchlings were found in a wildlife sanctuary in eastern Cambodia.

Priority projects 
High priority projects include:
Status surveys and development of crocodile management and conservation programmes in Cambodia and Laos: These two countries appear to be the remaining stronghold of the species. Identifying key areas and populations, and obtaining quantitative estimates of population size as a precursor to initiating conservation programs is needed.
Implementation of protection of habitat and restocking in Thailand: Thailand has the best-organized protected-areas system, the largest source of farm-raised crocodiles for restocking, and the most-developed crocodile management programme in the region. Although the species has virtually disappeared from the wild, re-establishment of viable populations in protected areas is feasible.
Protection of crocodile populations in Vietnam: a combination of habitat protection and captive breeding could prevent loss of the species in Vietnam. A breeding population has been successfully re-established in Cát Tiên National Park.  Further surveys, identification of suitable localities and the implementation of a conservation programme coordinated with the captive breeding efforts of Vietnamese institutions is needed.
Investigation of the taxonomy of the freshwater crocodiles in Southeast Asia and the Indo-Malaysian Archipelago: The relationships among the freshwater crocodiles in the Indo-Malaysian Archipelago are poorly understood. Clarification of these relationships is of scientific interest and has important implications for conservation.

Other projects include:
Coordination of captive breeding, trade and conservation in the South east Asian region: Several countries in the region are already deeply involved in captive breeding programs for commercial use. Integration of this activity with necessary conservation actions for the wild populations (including funding surveys and conservation) could be a powerful force for conservation. A long term aim could be the re-establishment of viable wild populations and their sustainable use by ranching.
Maintain a stock of pure C. siamensis in crocodile farms: The bulk of the captives worldwide are maintained in several farms in Thailand where extensive interbreeding with C. porosus has taken place. Hybrids are preferred for their superior commercial qualities, but the hybridisation threatens the genetic integrity of the most threatened species of crocodilians. Farms should be encouraged to segregate genetically pure Siamese crocodiles for conservation, in addition to the hybrids they are promoting for hide production.
Survey and protection of Siamese crocodiles in Indonesia: Verification of the presence of C. siamensis in Kalimantan and Java is a first step to developing protection for the species within the context of the developing crocodile management strategy in Indonesia.

Cultural references
A Malay folktale features a crocodile that is outwitted by a mouse-deer and buffaloes.
A Siamese crocodile has been cited in the Thai folklore of Central Thailand's Krai Thong ("ไกรทอง") tales have known as well, and was taken to create a television series and movies several times.

A Siamese crocodile stars as the titular monster in the 1978 Thailand film Crocodile.

References

External links 

 Crocodylus siamensis – The Crocodile Specialist Group.
 Crocodylus siamensis – from the Biodiversity Heritage Library 
 Action Plan for Crocodylus siamensis. IUCN/SSC Crocodile Specialist Group – Status Survey and Conservation Action Plan, 2nd edition.
 
 
 

Crocodylidae
Crocodilians of Asia
Reptiles of Southeast Asia
Reptiles of Borneo
Reptiles of Myanmar
Reptiles of Cambodia
Reptiles of India
Reptiles of Indonesia
Reptiles of Laos
Reptiles of Malaysia
Reptiles of Thailand
Reptiles of Vietnam
Critically endangered fauna of Asia
Reptiles described in 1801